Falerna is a town and comune in the province of Catanzaro, in the Calabria region of southern Italy. It lies on the A3 motorway.

There are two sections of the city.  Falerna, the oldest section, lies atop a set of cliffs.  Falerna Marina is situated on the seashore and boasts a fine beach and several hotels.  Castiglione Marittimo is a "frazione" of the Falerna municipality; it is a former Norman outpost.

Many of Falerna's inhabitants emigrated to the United States, in particular western Pennsylvania, and a few have returned to their home town in retirement.  Older residents speak a distinct dialect of Italian known as Falernese.  It is dying out as media and schools continue to standardize the Italian language throughout the nation.

References

External links
 Pro Loco website (tourist association)

Cities and towns in Calabria